The Arado Ar 199 was a floatplane aircraft, built by Arado Flugzeugwerke. It was a low-wing monoplane, designed in 1938 to be launched from a catapult and operated over water. The enclosed cockpit had two side-by-side seats for instructor and student, and a third, rear seat, for a trainee-navigator or radio operator.

Two of the 5 prototypes, D-IFRB and D-ISBC did serve as trainers and were used for air-sea rescue operations from Northern Norway.

Specifications(Ar 199)

References

Notes

Bibliography
 

1930s German military trainer aircraft
Ar 199